Qianliyan, Qianli Yan, or Qian Li Yan usually refers to the demon guardian of the Chinese goddess Mazu.

It may also refer to:

 Qianliyan Island, off Qingdao, Shandong, China
 HLKX Clairvoyance, a drone
 IPT FMS-280 Clairvoyance, a drone
 Xinying Clairvoyance, a drone
 TX-2000 Clairvoyance, a drone